Ivan Ivanovich Sergeyev was the former Director General of GlavUpDK, the Main Administration for Service to the Diplomatic Corps. He was Ambassador Extraordinary and Plenipotentiary and is an Honored Developer of Russia. He was one of the founding fathers of Russian Golf.

See also
Moscow Country Club

Golf in Russia